Micropentila ugandae is a butterfly in the family Lycaenidae. It is found in Cameroon, Gabon, the Republic of the Congo, the Democratic Republic of the Congo (Uele, Tshopa and Lualaba), Uganda and north-western Tanzania. The habitat consists of primary forests.

References

Butterflies described in 1933
Poritiinae